Glendola may refer to:

Glendola Reservoir
Glendola, New Jersey